Jesse Zubot (of Britannia Beach, British Columbia) is a Canadian musician primarily known for his unique violin playing. Zubot also works as a composer, producer and recording engineer.

History

Zubot's acoustic-instrumental group Zubot and Dawson won a Juno Award in 2003 for Roots & Traditional Group Album of the Year.  Zubot was also a member of 2004 Juno Award-winning group Great Uncles of the Revolution. Both groups released their albums on the Canadian roots label Black Hen Music although 'Zubot & Dawson' albums were ultimately licensed to True North Records.  Since 2003 Zubot has toured with throat-singer Tanya Tagaq, Dan Mangan, 7 piece art-rock ensemble Fond of Tigers, Stars, Hawksley Workman, Ndidi Onukwulu, Jim Byrnes, Kelly Joe Phelps and many others.  Zubot is a member of the seven-piece post-everything ensemble Fond of Tigers.  Fond of Tigers won a Juno Award in 2011 in the Instrumental category.

Since the early 2000s Zubot has spent time working in the improvised and creative music scenes with artists such as Evan Parker, Jean Martin, François Houle, Joe Fonda, Mats Gustafsson, Orkestra Rova, Dylan van der Schyff, Tony Wilson, Fred Frith, Peggy Lee, David Tronzo, Gerry Hemingway, Henry Kaiser, Matthew Bourne, Nels Cline, Humcrush and many others.

Zubot created Drip Audio in 2005.  Drip Audio is a record label dedicated to creative music stemming from the Vancouver underground scene and now includes creations by musicians from Toronto, Montreal, Los Angeles, New York and London.  The musical diversity of Drip Audio is quite varied.

Zubot has produced recordings for artists Tanya Tagaq, Alpha Yaya Diallo, Inhabitants, Ndidi Onukwulu, Fond of Tigers, Viviane Houle, Tony Wilson, Copilots, The Sands and many others.

As a session musician Zubot has appeared on recordings by Destroyer, Stars, Dan Mangan, Justin Rutledge, Mother Mother, Amy Millan, Tanya Tagaq, Louise Burns, Veda Hille, Alan Doyle, Kelly Joe Phelps, Frog Eyes, Kathryn Calder, Alpha Yaya Diallo, Long John Baldry, Joe Keithley, Raffi, Jadea Kelly, Secret Mommy and The Be Good Tanyas.

Zubot's score for Benoît Lachambre & Su-Feh Lee's Body Scan was presented, with the piece, at the Centre Pompidou in Paris (March, 2009).   Zubot has composed pieces for both the Winnipeg Symphony Orchestra and Symphony Nova Scotia.

Zubot received a 'Multimedia Award' at 2010's Western Canadian Music Awards with Tanya Tagaq for their work on the short film Tungijuq, and a Boh Cameronian Arts Award 'Best Music & Sound Design' (Malaysia / 2012) for Su-Feh Lee's dance piece The Whole Beast

Zubot is a three time recipient of the National Jazz Award for Violinist of the Year (Canada).

A live album by Tagaq called Anuraaqtuq, featuring Zubot on violin and viola, was released fall of 2011 on Victo Records. This concert was recorded at The Festival International de Musique Actuelle de Victoriaville in 2010.

On 27 May 2014 Tagaq released the album Animism, produced by Zubot and released by Six Shooter Records.  On Monday, 21 Sept. 2014 it won the Polaris Music Prize.  On 14 March 2015 it won a 
Juno Award for Aboriginal Album of the Year.

Zubot was nominated for a Juno Award in the 'Producer of the Year' category in 2015 for his work on Tanya Tagaq's 'Animism'.
 
On 12 Jan 2015 Zubot was nominated for a Canadian Screen Award with Dan Mangan for their Original Score to the feature film Hector and the Search for Happiness.

Zubot was named 'Producer of the Year' at the 2015 Western Canadian Music Awards.

Discography (Solo or Group Member)
1998: Zubot & Dawson - Strang (Black Hen Music)
2000: Zubot & Dawson - Further Adventures in Strang: Tractor Parts (Black Hen Music)
2001: Great Uncles of the Revolution - Stand Up (Black Hen Music)
2002: Zubot & Dawson - Chicken Scratch (True North Records)
2003: Great Uncles of the Revolution - Blow The House Down (Black Hen Music)
2005: Zubotta (Drip Audio)
2005: LaConnor (Drip Audio)
2006: Fond of Tigers - A Thing to Live With (Drip Audio)
2006: Jesse Zubot - Dementia (Drip Audio) 
2007: ZMF Trio - Circle The Path (Drip Audio)
2007: Tony Wilson 6tet - Pearls Before Swine (Drip Audio)
2007: Fond of Tigers - Release the Saviours (Drip Audio)
2009: Gord Grdina's East Van Strings - The Breathing of Statues (Songlines)
2010: Fond of Tigers - Continent & Western (Drip Audio)
2010: The Element Choir - At Rosedale United (Barnyard Records)
2011: Tanya Tagaq - Anuraaqtuq (Victo Records)
2012: Gordon Grdina's Haram - Her Eyes Illuminate (Songlines)
2014: Tanya Tagaq - Animism (Six Shooter Records)
2014: Hector and the Search For Happiness (Original Motion Picture Soundtrack) - Various Artists (Varèse Sarabande Records)
2015: Dan Mangan + Blacksmith - Club Meds (Arts & Crafts)
2015: Tony Wilson 6Tet - A Day's Life (Drip Audio)
2016: Fond of Tigers - Uninhabit (Drip Audio/Offseason Records)

See also

Music of Canada
List of Canadian musicians

References

External links
 Jesse Zubot
 

Year of birth missing (living people)
Living people
Musicians from British Columbia
Canadian folk violinists
Canadian jazz violinists
Canadian male violinists and fiddlers
Canadian session musicians
Canadian record producers
21st-century Canadian violinists and fiddlers
21st-century Canadian male musicians
Canadian male jazz musicians